Sajid-Farhad is an Indian film director and writer duo consisting of brothers Sajid Samji and Farhad Samji. Their work as writers include the films Shiva, Sunday, Double Dhamaal, Golmaal Returns, All The Best: Fun Begins, Housefull 2, Ready, Golmaal 3, Singham, Bol Bachchan, Chashme Baddoor, Himmatwala, Chennai Express, Entertainment and Singham Returns. Five of the films they have written have entered the Bollywood 100 crore club. In 2014, they started directing films with Entertainment.

Career 
The brothers were born in an Aga Khani (Khoja) Nizari Ismaili family.

The duo started their career as lyricists. David Dhawan roped them in for the film Hum Kisise Kum Nahin (2002). Sajid-Farhad first tasted success as lyricists with the song "M Bole Toh" from Munnabhai MBBS (2004). After that they got an offer from Ram Gopal Varma for Shiva (2006) and thereafter they penned dialogues for Rohit Shetty's Sunday (2008) and Golmaal Returns (2008).

The duo made their directorial debut with Entertainment, a slapstick comedy film starring Akshay Kumar and Tamannah. The film was released on 8 August 2014. Their next film Housefull 3 starring Akshay Kumar, Lisa Haydon and Nargis Fakhri was released on 3 June 2016.

In 2018, Farhad wrote and directed a comedy web-series, Baby Come Naa for Ekta Kapoor's OTT platform ALT Balaji starring Shreyas Talpade, Chunky Pandey, Kiku Sharda, Shefali Zariwala and Manasi Scott.

Filmography

Lyricists

Writers

Directors

References

External links 

Year of birth missing (living people)
Living people
Film directors from Mumbai
Hindi-language film directors
Indian male screenwriters
Indian screenwriting duos
Indian filmmaking duos
Indian Ismailis
Khoja Ismailism
Gujarati people